The 2005 Nagoya Grampus Eight season was Nagoya Grampus Eight's 13th season in the J. League Division 1 and 24th overall in the Japanese top flight. The club started the season under the management of Nelsinho, but he was sacked and replaced by Hitoshi Nakata. Nagoya finished the season in 14th place in the League, reached the Fifth Round of the Emperor's Cup and finished 3rd in Group D of the J. League Cup.

Domestic results

J. League 1

Table

Emperor's Cup

J.League Cup

Player statistics

Other pages
 J. League official site

Nagoya Grampus Eight
Nagoya Grampus seasons